Gove City, more commonly known as Gove, is a city in and the county seat of Gove County, Kansas, United States.  As of the 2020 census, the population of the city was 80.

History
Gove City was founded in 1885. It was designated county seat in 1886, and incorporated in 1888. It is named for Grenville Gove, member of the 11th Kansas Cavalry Regiment.

Geography
Gove City is located at  (38.959576, -100.487316).

Climate
The climate in this area is characterized by hot, humid summers and generally mild to cool winters.  According to the Köppen Climate Classification system, Gove City has a humid subtropical climate, abbreviated "Cfa" on climate maps.

Demographics

2010 census
As of the census of 2010, there were 80 people, 37 households, and 22 families residing in the city. The racial makeup of the city was 97.5% White and 2.5% from two or more races.

There were 37 households, of which 21.6% had children under the age of 18 living with them, 51.4% were married couples living together, 2.7% had a female householder with no husband present, 5.4% had a male householder with no wife present, and 40.5% were non-families. 35.1% of all households were made up of individuals, and 18.9% had someone living alone who was 65 years of age or older. The average household size was 2.16 and the average family size was 2.86.

The median age in the city was 48 years. 22.5% of residents were under the age of 18; 5.1% were between the ages of 18 and 24; 18.9% were from 25 to 44; 31.4% were from 45 to 64; and 22.5% were 65 years of age or older. The gender makeup of the city was 48.8% male and 51.3% female.

2000 census
As of the census of 2000, there were 105 people, 45 households, and 27 families residing in the city. The racial makeup of the city was 98.10% White, 0.95% Native American, and 0.95% from two or more races. Hispanic or Latino of any race were 1.90% of the population.

There were 45 households, out of which 28.9% had children under the age of 18 living with them, 51.1% were married couples living together, 8.9% had a female householder with no husband present, and 40.0% were non-families. 35.6% of all households were made up of individuals, and 22.2% had someone living alone who was 65 years of age or older. The average household size was 2.33 and the average family size was 3.15.

In the city, the population was spread out, with 30.5% under the age of 18, 4.8% from 18 to 24, 23.8% from 25 to 44, 18.1% from 45 to 64, and 22.9% who were 65 years of age or older. The median age was 40 years. For every 100 females, there were 75.0 males. For every 100 females age 18 and over, there were 69.8 males.

The median income for a household in the city was $23,438, and the median income for a family was $42,813. Males had a median income of $22,500 versus $20,625 for females. The per capita income for the city was $11,870. There were 20.0% of families and 34.5% of the population living below the poverty line, including 58.5% of under eighteens and 7.7% of those over 64.

Education
Gove is a part of USD 292 Wheatland. The Wheatland High School mascot is a Thunderhawk.

Gove High School was closed through school unification. The Gove High School team name was Gove Panthers.

References

Further reading

External links
 Gove City - Directory of Public Officials
 USD 292, local school district
 Gove City Map, KDOT

Cities in Kansas
County seats in Kansas
Cities in Gove County, Kansas
Populated places established in 1885
1885 establishments in Kansas